Şahməmmədli (also, Shakhmamedli and Shakhmetli) is a village in the Goranboy Rayon of Azerbaijan.  The village forms part of the municipality of Goranboy.

References 

Populated places in Goranboy District